Carrabelle is a city in Franklin County along Florida's Panhandle, United States. The population was 2,778 as of the 2010 census. Carrabelle is located east of Apalachicola at the mouth of the Carrabelle River on the Gulf of Mexico.

Geography
Carrabelle is located east of the center of Franklin County along the Carrabelle River and on St. James Island, between St. George Sound to the south and the Crooked and New rivers to the north. To the south is Dog Island, separating St. George Sound from the Gulf of Mexico.

U.S. Route 98 passes through Carrabelle, leading west  to Apalachicola and northeast  to Medart.

Carrabelle is the eastern terminus of the Gulf Intracoastal Waterway.

Demographics

The population of Carrabelle rose from 1,303 in 2000 to 2,778 in 2010 with the expansion of the city limits to the northeast to include the Franklin Correctional Institution.

As of the census of 2010, there were 2,778 people, 1,243 households, and 560 families residing in the city. The population density was 349.2 inhabitants per square mile (134.9/km2). The racial makeup of the city was 91.48% White, 5.68% African American, 0.31% Native American, 0.08% Asian, 0.08% Pacific Islander, 0.84% from other races, and 1.53% from two or more races. Hispanic or Latino of any race were 1.61% of the population.

There were 562 households, out of which 26.9% had children under the age of 18 living with them, 48.0% were married couples living together, 12.1% had a female householder with no husband present, and 34.0% were non-families. Of all households 30.6%  were made up of individuals, and 12.3% had someone living alone who was 65 years of age or older. The average household size was 2.30 and the average family size was 2.83.

In the city the population was spread out, with 23.3% under the age of 18, 7.8% from 18 to 24, 24.1% from 25 to 44, 27.5% from 45 to 64, and 17.3% who were 65 years of age or older. The median age was 41 years. For every 100 females, there were 93.3 males. For every 100 females age 18 and over, there were 92.3 males.

The median income for a household in the city was $23,749, and the median income for a family was $27,955. Males had a median income of $26,719 versus $19,018 for females. The per capita income for the city was $14,677. About 14.8% of families and 19.4% of the population were below the poverty line, including 18.9% of those under age 18 and 24.2% of those age 65 or over.

For many decades, Carrabelle had the only tertiary sewage treatment facility in the State of Florida, but this may have been updated in recent years.

History

In 1528, the first Spanish expedition of Pánfilo de Narváez passed through the area on its way from Tampa Bay to the Rio Grande. From the late 17th century through early 18th century, a few passages referring to the area are mentioned. Carrabelle, Dog Island, and St. George Island served as points to stage raids on local ports, as well as San Marcos de Apalache in 1677 and 1682.

In 1876, explorer Nathaniel Holmes Bishop of Medford, Massachusetts, navigated the Crooked River through the lowlands east to the Ochlockonee River. In 1877, Oliver Hudson Kelley from Massachusetts founded the town and named it "Rio Carrabella," after his niece, Caroline Hall. The following year, the first U.S. post office was established with its address as Rio Carrabella. Hall served as the town's first postmaster. The Town of Carrabelle was incorporated on December 24, 1881.

In 1891, the Carrabelle, Tallahassee and Georgia Railroad was established to connect Carrabelle northward through Tallahassee to the Florida-Georgia line, eventually terminating in Augusta, Georgia.

The city was chartered by the Florida Legislature in May 1893.

On August 1, 1899, the 2nd hurricane of the season struck the area, almost destroying the town and leaving just nine homes.

In 1942, Camp Gordon Johnston was opened for the purpose of training amphibious soldiers on nearby beaches. The camp trained a quarter of a million men and closed in 1946.

On August 23, 2008, Tropical Storm Fay made its record fourth landfall in the state of Florida at Carrabelle.

Notable people

 Richard W. Ervin, Jr. (1905–2004), born in Carrabelle, was the Florida Attorney General from 1949 to 1964, and he served as chief justice of the Florida Supreme Court from 1969 to 1971
 John Jordan "Buck" O'Neil (1911–2006), born in Carrabelle, was a distinguished Negro league baseball player and coach for the champion Kansas City Monarchs who, later, worked as a scout for the Chicago Cubs. With his gentle demeanor, he highlighted the work of African-Americans before their integration into the previously "whites only" world of Major League Baseball. He gained a national spotlight during his interviews with Ken Burns' PBS documentary named Baseball
 John Robinson, aviator
 Jack Rudloe, a writer and naturalist and cofounder of the Gulf Specimen Marine Laboratory at nearby Panacea, Florida – moved to Carabelle at age 14 and lived there for two years. As a young man from the city, he was profoundly and positively affected by his experiences after moving and living there and has maintained his ties to the community

Attractions and geological features 
 Boat Parade of Lights
 Camp Gordon Johnston Museum
 Carrabelle Beach
Carrabelle History Museum
 Carrabelle–Thompson Airport
 Carrabelle Riverfront Festival
 Crooked River Lighthouse
 Historic deepwater fishing village
 McKissack Ponds, five small ponds owned by Franklin County, near the Carrabelle–Thompson Airport
 St. James Bay Golf Club
 Tate's Hell State Forest
 Waterway to Dog Island, St George Sound, and eastern start point to the Gulf Intracoastal Waterway
 World's Smallest Police Station

World's Smallest Police Station

Carrabelle is the home of the "World's Smallest Police Station", which came into being on March 10, 1963. The city had been having problems with tourists making unauthorized long-distance phone calls on its police phone. The phone was located in a call box that was bolted to a building at the corner of U.S. 98 and Tallahassee Street. Johnnie Mirabella, St. Joe Telephone's lone Carrabelle employee at the time, first tried moving the call box to another building, but the illegal calls continued.

Mirabella noticed that the policeman would get drenched while answering phone calls when it was raining. So when the telephone company decided to replace its worn-out phone booth in front of Burda's Pharmacy, he decided to solve both problems at once by putting the police phone in the old booth.

With the help of Curly Messer, who was a deputy sheriff at the time, Mirabella moved the phone booth to its current site on U.S. 98. The booth did protect the officers from the elements, but some people still sneaked into it to make long-distance calls. Eventually the dial was removed from the phone, making it impossible for tourists to make calls.

It has been featured on television shows Real People, Ripley's Believe It or Not!, The Today Show, and The Tonight Show Starring Johnny Carson. It was featured in the movie Tate's Hell, which was produced at Florida State University. Along with police station T-shirts—the design is copyrighted—there are police station hats, visors, postcards, and calendars.

But life has not always been easy for the retired St. Joseph Telephone and Telegraph Company phone booth. Vandals have ripped phones out of the booth and shot holes through the glass. It has been knocked over by a pickup truck, a tourist once asked a gas station attendant to help him load it into his vehicle to take it back to Tennessee, and it was knocked over and damaged by Hurricane Kate. Today a replica still stands on the original spot along US Highway 98 in downtown Carrabelle. The original World's Smallest Police Station is safely housed and on display at the Carrabelle History Museum at 106 SE Avenue B, Carrabelle, FL.

Museums

Carrabelle has a local history museum, the Carrabelle History Museum, which is located at 106 SE Avenue B, in the historic Marvin Justiss building, also known as "Old City Hall". The museum is free and open on Wednesday and Sunday from 12 pm to 5 pm and on Thursday, Friday and Saturday from 10 am to 5 pm and by appointment other days, for visitors interested in learning about the history and culture of Carrabelle and the surrounding area.
The Camp Gordon Johnston World War II Museum is located at 1873 Highway 98 West, across the street from Carrabelle Public Beach, and admission is free. The museum was named after Colonel Gordon Johnston, an American soldier who served in the Spanish–American War, Philippine–American War and World War I.

It is the tallest lighthouse on the Forgotten Coast, standing 103 feet tall. The Carrabelle Lighthouse Association manages the Keeper's House Museum and a gift shop.

Education
Carrabelle is a part of the Franklin County Schools system.  Students attend the Franklin County K–12 School in Eastpoint, Florida, that was built in 2008.

Government and infrastructure
Franklin Correctional Institution, a prison of the Florida Department of Corrections, is within the city of Carrabelle.

Gallery

See also
Camp Gordon Johnston
Crooked River Light
Florida Panhandle
Forgotten Coast
Lanark Village

References

External links

 
 

Cities in Franklin County, Florida
Populated places on the Intracoastal Waterway in Florida
Beaches of Franklin County, Florida
Beaches of Florida
1877 establishments in Florida
Cities in Florida
Populated coastal places in Florida on the Gulf of Mexico